Mel Brooks (born Melvin James Kaminsky; June 28, 1926) is an American actor, comedian and filmmaker. With a career spanning over seven decades, he is known as a writer and director of a variety of successful broad farces and parodies. A recipient of numerous accolades he is one of 18 entertainers to win the EGOT, which includes an Emmy Award, a Grammy Award, an Academy Award ("Oscar"), and a Tony Award. He has also received a Kennedy Center Honor in 2009, a Hollywood Walk of Fame star in 2010, the AFI Life Achievement Award in 2013, a British Film Institute Fellowship in 2015, a National Medal of Arts in 2016, and a BAFTA Fellowship in 2017.

He began his career as a comic and a writer for Sid Caesar's variety show Your Show of Shows  from 1950 to 1954 alongside Woody Allen, Neil Simon and Larry Gelbart. With Carl Reiner, he created the comic character The 2000 Year Old Man and together they released several comedy albums starting with 2000 Year Old Man in 1960. He wrote, with Buck Henry, the hit television comedy series Get Smart from 1965 to 1970.

Brooks rose to prominence becoming one of the most successful film directors of the 1970s. His best-known films include The Producers (1967), The Twelve Chairs (1970), Blazing Saddles (1974), Young Frankenstein (1974), Silent Movie (1976), High Anxiety (1977), History of the World, Part I (1981), Spaceballs (1987), and Robin Hood: Men in Tights (1993). A musical adaptation of his first film, The Producers, ran on Broadway from 2001 to 2007 and was itself remade into a musical film in 2005. He wrote and produced the Hulu series History of the World, Part II (2023).

Brooks was married to actress Anne Bancroft from 1964 until her death in 2005. Their son Max Brooks is an actor and author, known for his novel World War Z: An Oral History of the Zombie War (2006). In 2021, Mel Brooks published a memoir titled All About Me! Three of his films ranked in the American Film Institute's list of the top 100 comedy films of the past 100 years (1900–2000), all of which ranked in the top 15 of the list: Blazing Saddles at number 6, The Producers at number 11, and Young Frankenstein at number 13.

Early life and education 
Brooks was born on a tenement kitchen table, on June 28, 1926, in Brownsville, Brooklyn, New York City, to Kate (née Brookman) and Max Kaminsky, and grew up in Williamsburg. His father's family were  German Jews from Danzig (Gdańsk, Poland); his mother's family were Jews from Kyiv, in the Pale of Settlement of the Russian Empire (present-day Ukraine). He had three older brothers: Irving, Lenny, and Bernie. His father died of tuberculosis of the kidney at 34 when Brooks was two years old. He has said of his father's death, "There's an outrage there. I may be angry at God, or at the world, for that. And I'm sure a lot of my comedy is based on anger and hostility. Growing up in Williamsburg, I learned to clothe it in comedy to spare myself problems—like a punch in the face."

Brooks was a small, sickly boy who often was bullied and teased by his classmates because of his size. He grew up in tenement housing. At age nine, he went to a Broadway show with his maternal uncle Joe—a taxi driver who drove the Broadway doormen back to Brooklyn for free and was given the tickets in gratitude—and saw Anything Goes with William Gaxton, Ethel Merman and Victor Moore at the Alvin Theater. After the show, he told his uncle that he was not going to work in the garment district like everyone else but was absolutely going into show business.

When Brooks was 14 he gained employment as a pool-side tummler (entertainer) at the Butler Lodge, a second-rate Borscht Belt hotel, where he met 18-year-old Sid Caesar. Brooks kept his guests amused with his crazy antics. In a Playboy interview, he explained that one day he stood at the edge of a diving board wearing a derby and a large alpaca overcoat with two suitcases full of rocks, who then announced: "Business is terrible! I can't go on!" before jumping, fully clothed into the pool. He was taught by Buddy Rich (who had also grown up in Williamsburg) how to play the drums, and started to earn money as a musician when he was 14. During his time as a drummer, he was given his first opportunity as a comedian at the age of 16, filling in for an ill MC. During his teens, he changed his name to Melvin Brooks, influenced by his mother's maiden name Brookman, after being confused with trumpeter Max Kaminsky.

Brooks graduated from Eastern District High School in January 1944 and intended to follow his older brother and enroll in Brooklyn College to study psychology.

World War II service
In early 1944, in his senior year at Eastern District High School, Brooks was recruited to take the Army General Classification Test, a Stanford–Binet-type IQ test.
After scoring highly, Brooks was sent to the Army Specialized Training Program at the Virginia Military Institute to be taught electrical engineering, horse riding, and saber fighting. In 1944, Brooks was drafted into the Army. Twelve weeks later, when he turned 18, he officially joined the United States Army at the Fort Dix, New Jersey, induction center, and was sent to the Field Artillery Replacement Training Center at Fort Sill, Oklahoma for basic training and radio operator training. Brooks was then sent back to Fort Dix for overseas assignment. Brooks says he boarded the SS Sea Owl at the Brooklyn Navy Yard around February 15, 1945. A reporter for the United States Department of Defense writes that Brooks arrived in France in November 1944, and later to Belgium, serving with the 78th Infantry Division as a forward artillery observer. In February 1945, a short while later, Brooks was transferred to the 1104th Engineer Combat Battalion as a combat engineer, participating in the Battle of the Bulge.

"Along the roadside, you'd see bodies wrapped up in mattress covers and stacked in a ditch, and those would be Americans, that could be me. I sang all the time ... I never wanted to think about it ... Death is the enemy of everyone, and even though you hate Nazis, death is more of an enemy than a German soldier."

Stationed in Saarbrücken and Baumholder, the battalion was responsible for clearing booby-trapped buildings and defusing land mines as the Allies advanced into Nazi Germany. Brooks was tasked with land mine location; defusing was done by a specialist. Brooks has stated that when he heard Germans singing over loudspeakers, Brooks responded by singing into a bullhorn, Toot, Toot, Tootsie (Goo' Bye!) by Jewish Al Jolson. Brooks spent time in the stockade after taking an anti-Semitic heckler's helmet off and smashing him in the head with his mess kit. His unit constructed the first Bailey bridge over the Roer River, later building bridges over the Rhine River. In April 1945, Brooks' unit conducted reconnaissance missions in the Harz Mountains, Germany, when the war ended.

With the end of the war in Europe, Brooks joined the Special Services as a comic touring Army bases and he was made acting corporal and put in charge of entertainment at Wiesbaden. and performed at Fort Dix. In June 1946, Brooks was honorably discharged from the Army as a corporal.

Career

Early career 
After the war, Brooks' mother had secured him a job as a clerk at the Brooklyn Navy Yard, but Brooks "got into a taxi and ordered the driver to take him to the Catskills", where he started working in various Borscht Belt resorts and nightclubs in the Catskill Mountains as a drummer and pianist. When a regular comic at one of the clubs was too sick to perform, Brooks started working as a stand-up comic, telling jokes and doing movie-star impressions. He also began acting in summer stock in Red Bank, New Jersey, and did some radio work. He eventually worked his way up to the comically aggressive job of tummler at Grossinger's, one of the Borscht Belt's most famous resorts.

"In the years after the war, Brooks’ hero was comedian Sid Caesar. Back in New York, Brooks would slink around trying to catch Caesar in between meetings to pitch him joke ideas. Eventually Caesar cracked and paid Brooks a little cash to throw him gags....At 24, Brooks got his break as a full-time writer."

He found more rewarding work behind the scenes, becoming a comedy writer for television. In 1949, his friend Sid Caesar hired him to write jokes for the DuMont/NBC series The Admiral Broadway Revue, paying him, off-the-books, $50 a week.

1950s: Your Show of Shows 
In 1950, Caesar created the revolutionary variety comedy series Your Show of Shows and hired Brooks as a writer along with Carl Reiner, Neil Simon, Danny Simon, and head writer Mel Tolkin. The writing staff proved widely influential. Reiner, as creator of The Dick Van Dyke Show, based Morey Amsterdam's character Buddy Sorell on Brooks. Likewise, the film My Favorite Year (1982) is loosely based on Brooks' experiences as a writer on the show including an encounter with the actor Errol Flynn. Neil Simon's play Laughter on the 23rd Floor (1993) is also loosely based on the production of the show, and the character Ira Stone is based on Brooks. Your Show of Shows ended in 1954 when performer Imogene Coca left to host her own show. Caesar then created Caesar's Hour with most of the same cast and writers (including Brooks and adding Woody Allen and Larry Gelbart). It ran from 1954 until 1957.

1960s: The 2000 Year Old Man and Get Smart 
Brooks and co-writer Reiner had become close friends and began to casually improvise comedy routines when they were not working. In October 1959, for a Random House book launch of Moss Harts autobiography, Act One, at Mamma Leone’s, Mel Tolkin (standing in for Carl Reiner) and Mel Brooks performed, and it was later recalled by Kenneth Tynan. Reiner played the straight-man interviewer and set Brooks up as anything from a Tibetan monk to an astronaut. As Reiner explained: "In the evening, we'd go to a party and I'd pick a character for him to play. I never told him what it was going to be." On one of these occasions, Reiner's suggestion concerned a 2000-year-old man who had witnessed the crucifixion of Jesus Christ (who "came in the store but never bought anything"), had been married several hundred times and had "over forty-two thousand children, and not one comes to visit me". At first Brooks and Reiner only performed the routine for friends but, by the late 1950s, it gained a reputation in New York City. Kenneth Tynan saw the comedy duo perform at a party in 1959 and wrote that Brooks "was the most original comic improvisor I had ever seen".

In 1960, Brooks, without his family, moved from New York to Hollywood, returning in 1961. He and Reiner began performing the "2000 Year Old Man" act on The Steve Allen Show. Their performances led to the release of the comedy album 2000 Years with Carl Reiner and Mel Brooks that sold over a million copies in 1961. They eventually expanded their routine with two more albums in 1961 and 1962, a revival in 1973, a 1975 animated TV special, and a reunion album in 1998. At one point, when Brooks had financial and career struggles, the record sales from the 2000 Year Old Man were his chief source of income.

Brooks adapted the 2000 Year Old Man character to create the 2500-Year-Old Brewmaster for Ballantine Beer in the 1960s. Interviewed by Dick Cavett in a series of ads, the Brewmaster (in a German accent, as opposed to the 2000 Year Old Man's Yiddish accent) said he was inside the original Trojan horse and "could've used a six-pack of fresh air".

Brooks was involved in the creation of the Broadway musical All American which debuted on Broadway in 1962. He wrote the play with lyrics by Lee Adams and music by Charles Strouse. It starred Ray Bolger as a southern science professor at a large university who uses the principles of engineering on the college's football team and the team begins to win games. It was directed by Joshua Logan, who script-doctored the second act and added a gay subtext to the plot. It ran for 80 performances and received two Tony Award nominations.

The animated short film The Critic (1963), a satire of arty, esoteric cinema, was conceived by Brooks and directed by Ernest Pintoff. Brooks supplied running commentary as the baffled moviegoer trying to make sense of the obscure visuals. It won the Academy Award for Animated Short Film.

With comedy writer Buck Henry, Brooks created a TV comedy show titled Get Smart, about a bumbling James Bond-inspired spy. Brooks said, "I was sick of looking at all those nice sensible situation comedies. They were such distortions of life... I wanted to do a crazy, unreal comic-strip kind of thing about something besides a family. No one had ever done a show about an idiot before. I decided to be the first." Starring Don Adams as Maxwell Smart, Agent 86, the series ran from 1965 until 1970, although Brooks had little involvement after the first season. It was highly rated for most of its production and won seven Emmy Awards, including Outstanding Comedy Series in 1968 and 1969.

Early work as a director
During a press conference for All American, a reporter asked, "What are you going to do next?" and Brooks replied, "Springtime for Hitler," perhaps riffing on Springtime for Henry. For several years, Brooks toyed with a bizarre and unconventional idea about a musical comedy of Adolf Hitler. He explored the idea as a novel and a play before finally writing a script. He eventually found two producers to fund it, Joseph E. Levine and Sidney Glazier, and made his first feature film, The Producers (1968).

The Producers was so brazen in its satire that major studios would not touch it, nor would many exhibitors. Brooks finally found an independent distributor who released it as an art film, a specialized attraction. At the 41st Academy Awards, Brooks won the Academy Award for Best Original Screenplay for the film over fellow writers Stanley Kubrick and John Cassavetes. The Producers became a smash underground hit, first on the nationwide college circuit, then in revivals and on home video. It premiered to a limited audience in Pittsburgh, Pennsylvania on November 22, 1967, before achieving a wide release in 1968.  Peter Sellers personally championed the film, paying out of pocket to take out full page ads in Variety and The New York Times.  Brooks later adapted it into a musical along with his collaborator Thomas Meehan, which was hugely successful on Broadway and received an unprecedented 12 Tony awards.

With the moderate financial success of the film The Producers, Glazier financed Brooks' next film, The Twelve Chairs (1970). Loosely based on Ilf and Petrov's 1928 Russian novel of the same name about greedy materialism in post-revolutionary Russia, it stars Ron Moody, Frank Langella and Dom DeLuise as three men individually searching for a fortune in diamonds hidden in a set of 12 antique chairs. Brooks makes a cameo appearance as an alcoholic ex-serf who "yearns for the regular beatings of yesteryear". The film was shot in Yugoslavia with a budget of $1.5 million. It received poor reviews and was not financially successful.

1970s: Success as a Hollywood director 
Brooks then wrote an adaptation of Oliver Goldsmith's She Stoops to Conquer, but was unable to sell the idea to any studio and believed that his career was over. In 1972, he met agent David Begelman, who helped him set up a deal with Warner Brothers to hire Brooks (as well as Richard Pryor, Andrew Bergman, Norman Steinberg, and Alan Uger) as a script doctor for an unproduced script called Tex-X. Eventually, Brooks was hired as director for what became Blazing Saddles (1974), his third film.

Blazing Saddles starred Cleavon Little, Gene Wilder, Harvey Korman, Slim Pickens, Madeline Kahn, Alex Karras, and Brooks himself, with cameos by Dom DeLuise and Count Basie. It had music by Brooks and John Morris, and a modest budget of $2.6 million. A satire on the Western film genre, it references older films such as Destry Rides Again (1939), High Noon (1952), Once Upon a Time in the West (1968), and The Treasure of the Sierra Madre (1948). In a surreal sequence towards the end, it references the extravagant musicals of Busby Berkeley.

Despite mixed reviews, Blazing Saddles was a success with younger audiences. It became the second-highest US grossing film of 1974, grossing $119.5 million in the United States and Canada. It was nominated for three Academy Awards: Best Actress in a Supporting Role for Madeline Kahn, Best Film Editing, and Best Music, Original Song. It won the Writers Guild of America Award for Best Comedy Written Directly for the Screen; and in 2006 it was deemed "culturally, historically or aesthetically significant" by the Library of Congress and selected for preservation in the National Film Registry. Brooks has said that the film "has to do with love more than anything else. I mean when that black guy rides into that Old Western town and even a little old lady says 'Up yours, nigger!', you know that his heart is broken. So it's really the story of that heart being mended." Brooks described the film as "a Jewish western with a black hero."

When Gene Wilder replaced Gig Young as the Waco Kid, he did so only when Brooks agreed that his next film would be a script that Wilder had been working on: a spoof of the Universal series of Frankenstein films from several decades earlier. After the filming of Blazing Saddles was completed, Wilder and Brooks began writing the script for Young Frankenstein and shot it in the spring of 1974. It starred Wilder, Marty Feldman, Peter Boyle, Teri Garr, Madeline Kahn, Cloris Leachman and Kenneth Mars, with Gene Hackman in a cameo role. Brooks' voice can be heard three times: as the wolf howl when the characters are on their way to the castle; as the voice of Victor Frankenstein, when the characters discover the laboratory; and as the sound of a cat when Gene Wilder accidentally throws a dart out of the window in a scene with Kenneth Mars. Composer John Morris again provided the score, and Universal monsters special effects veteran Kenneth Strickfaden worked on the film.

Young Frankenstein was the third-highest-grossing film domestically of 1974, just behind Blazing Saddles with a gross of $86 million.  It also received two Academy Award nominations for Adapted Screenplay and Best Sound. It received some of the best reviews of Brooks' career. Even notoriously hard-to-please critic Pauline Kael liked it, saying: "Brooks makes a leap up as a director because, although the comedy doesn't build, he carries the story through ... [He] even has a satisfying windup, which makes this just about the only comedy of recent years that doesn't collapse."

In 1975, at the height of his movie career, Brooks tried TV again with When Things Were Rotten, a Robin Hood parody that lasted only 13 episodes. Nearly 20 years later, in response to the 1991 hit film Robin Hood: Prince of Thieves, Brooks mounted another Robin Hood parody, Robin Hood: Men in Tights (1993). It resurrected several pieces of dialogue from his TV series, and from earlier Brooks films.

Brooks followed up his two hit films with an audacious idea: the first feature-length silent comedy in four decades. Silent Movie (1976) was written by Brooks and Ron Clark, and starred Brooks in his first leading role, with Dom DeLuise, Marty Feldman, Sid Caesar, Bernadette Peters, and in cameo roles playing themselves: Paul Newman, Burt Reynolds, James Caan, Liza Minnelli, Anne Bancroft, and the mime Marcel Marceau, who ironically uttered the film's only word of audible dialogue: "Non!" It was panned by critics and was not as successful as Brooks' previous two films but it did gross $36 million. Later that year, he was named fifth on the Top Ten Money Making Stars Poll.

High Anxiety (1977), Brooks' parody of the films of Alfred Hitchcock, was written by Brooks, Ron Clark, Rudy De Luca, and Barry Levinson, and was the first movie Brooks produced himself. Starring Brooks, Madeline Kahn, Cloris Leachman, Harvey Korman, Ron Carey, Howard Morris, and Dick Van Patten, it satirizes such Hitchcock films as Vertigo, Spellbound, Psycho, The Birds, North by Northwest, Dial M for Murder and Suspicion. Brooks plays Professor Richard H. (Harpo) Thorndyke, a Nobel Prize-winning psychologist who suffers from "high anxiety".

1980s–1990s: Later film career 

By 1980, Gene Siskel and Roger Ebert had referred to Mel Brooks and Woody Allen as "the two most successful comedy directors in the world today ... America's two funniest filmmakers". Released that year was the dramatic film The Elephant Man directed by David Lynch and produced by Brooks. Knowing that anyone seeing a poster reading "Mel Brooks presents The Elephant Man" would expect a comedy, he set up the company Brooksfilms. It has since produced a number of non-comedy films, including Frances (1982), The Fly (1986), and 84 Charing Cross Road (1987) starring Anthony Hopkins and Anne Bancroft—as well as comedies, including Richard Benjamin's My Favorite Year (1982), partially based on Mel Brooks' real life. Brooks sought to purchase the rights to 84 Charing Cross Road for his wife, Anne Bancroft, for many years. He also produced the comedy Fatso (1980) that Bancroft directed.

In 1981, Brooks joked that the only genres that he hadn't spoofed were historical epics and Biblical spectacles. History of the World Part I was a tongue-in-cheek look at human culture from the Dawn of Man to the French Revolution. Written, produced and directed by Brooks, with narration by Orson Welles, it was another modest financial hit, earning $31 million. It received mixed critical reviews. Critic Pauline Kael, who for years had been critical of Brooks, said, "Either you get stuck thinking about the bad taste or you let yourself laugh at the obscenity in the humor as you do Buñuel's perverse dirty jokes."

Brooks produced and starred in (but did not write or direct) a remake of Ernst Lubitsch's 1942 film To Be or Not to Be. His 1983 version was directed by Alan Johnson and starred Brooks, Anne Bancroft, Charles Durning, Tim Matheson, Jose Ferrer and Christopher Lloyd. It generated international publicity by featuring a controversial song on its soundtrack—"To Be or Not to Be (The Hitler Rap)"—satirizing German society in the 1940s, with Brooks playing Hitler.

The second movie Brooks directed in the 1980s was Spaceballs (1987), a parody of science fiction, mainly Star Wars. It starred Bill Pullman, John Candy, Rick Moranis, Daphne Zuniga, Dick Van Patten, Joan Rivers, Dom DeLuise, and Brooks.

In 1989, Brooks (with co-executive producer Alan Spencer) made another attempt at television success with the sitcom The Nutt House, featuring Brooks regulars Harvey Korman and Cloris Leachman. It was originally broadcast on NBC, but the network aired only five of the eleven produced episodes before canceling the series. During the next decade, Brooks directed Life Stinks (1991), Robin Hood: Men in Tights (1993), and Dracula: Dead and Loving It (1995). People magazine wrote, "Anyone in a mood for a hearty laugh couldn't do better than Robin Hood: Men in Tights, which gave fans a parody of Robin Hood, especially Robin Hood: Prince of Thieves." Like Brooks' other films, it is filled with one-liners and the occasional breaking of the fourth wall. Robin Hood: Men in Tights was Brooks' second time exploring the life of Robin Hood (the first, as mentioned above, being his 1975 TV show When Things Were Rotten). Life Stinks was a financial and critical failure, but is notable as the only film Brooks directed that is neither a parody nor a film about other films or theater. (The Twelve Chairs was a parody of the original novel.)

2000s: Musicals and television 

Brooks' musical adaptation of his film The Producers on the Broadway stage broke the Tony Award record with 12 wins, a record previously held for 37 years by Hello, Dolly! with 10 wins. It led to a 2005 big-screen version of the Broadway adaptation/remake with Matthew Broderick, Nathan Lane, Gary Beach, and Roger Bart reprising their stage roles, and new cast members Uma Thurman and Will Ferrell. In early April 2006, Brooks began composing the score to a Broadway musical adaptation of Young Frankenstein, which he says is "perhaps the best movie [he] ever made". The world premiere was at Seattle's Paramount Theater, between August 7, 2007, and September 1, 2007, after which it opened on Broadway at the former Lyric Theater (then the Hilton Theatre), New York, on October 11, 2007. It earned mixed reviews from the critics. In the 2000s, Brooks worked on an animated series sequel to Spaceballs called Spaceballs: The Animated Series, which premiered on September 21, 2008, on G4 TV.

Brooks has also supplied vocal roles for animation. He voiced Bigweld, the master inventor, in the animated film Robots (2005), and in the later animated film Mr. Peabody & Sherman (2014) he had a cameo appearance as Albert Einstein. He returned, to voice Dracula's father, Vlad, in Hotel Transylvania 2 (2015) and Hotel Transylvania 3: Summer Vacation (2018).

Brooks joked about the concept of a musical adaptation of Blazing Saddles in the final number in Young Frankenstein, in which the full company sings, "next year, Blazing Saddles!" In 2010, Brooks confirmed this, saying that the musical could be finished within a year; however, no creative team or plan has been announced.

On October 18, 2021, it was announced that Brooks would write and produce History of the World, Part II, a follow-up TV series on Hulu to his 1981 movie. In 2021, at age 95, Brooks published a memoir titled All About Me!

Personal life 

Brooks met Florence Baum, a dancer in Gentlemen Prefer Blondes, on Broadway. They were married from 1953 until their divorce in 1962. They had three children: Stephanie, Nicky, and Eddie.

According to David DeLuise on Wizards of Waverley Pod, Mel Brooks is his godfather. DeLuise's father Dom DeLuise was a frequent costar of Brooks in his earlier career.

After earning a salary of $5,000 a week on Your Show of Shows and Caesar's Hour, his salary dropped to $85 a week as a freelance writer. For five years he had few gigs, and was living in Greenwich Village on Perry Street in a fourth-floor walk-up. In 1960, to escape his situation, Brooks moved in with a friend, in Los Angeles. In 1961, after his return to New York, he found that Baum had begun suing him for legal separation. Marriage Is A Dirty Rotten Fraud was an autobiographical script based on his marriage. The Zero Mostel Show pilot's situation was a Building superintendent/janitor of Greenwich Village apartments. By  1966, Brooks was "living in a fairly old but comfortable New York town house".

Brooks married actress Anne Bancroft in 1964, and they remained together until her death in 2005. They met at a rehearsal for the Perry Como Variety Show in 1961, and were married three years later on August 5, 1964, at the Manhattan Marriage Bureau. Their son, Max Brooks, was born in 1972.

In 2010, Brooks credited Bancroft as "the guiding force" behind his involvement in developing The Producers and Young Frankenstein for the musical theater, saying of an early meeting with her: "From that day, until her death ... we were glued together." He has remained single since she died, stating in 2023 that "Once you are married to Anne Bancroft, others don't seem to be appealing".

Brooks is a voracious reader; in a profile for The New Yorker, Kenneth Tynan describes "Brooks the secret connoisseur, worshiper of good writing, and expert on the Russian classics, with special reference to Gogol, Turgenev, Dostoevski, and Tolstoy." In The Producers, Bialystock refers to Bloom as "Prince Myshkin", a character from Dostoevsky's The Idiot. And Leo Bloom is a reference to Leopold Bloom, hero of Joyce's Ulysses.

Regarding religion, Brooks stated: "I'm rather secular. I'm basically Jewish. But I think I'm Jewish not because of the Jewish religion at all. I think it's the relationship with the people and the pride I have. The tribe surviving so many misfortunes, and being so brave and contributing so much knowledge to the world and showing courage."

On Jewish cinema, Brooks said:"They can be anything and anywhere … if there's a tribal thing, like, the 'please God, protect us' feeling … we don't know where and how it's gonna come out. Avatar was a Jewish movie … these people on the run, chasing—and being pursued."

Brooks endorsed Joe Biden in the 2020 presidential election, in his first-ever public endorsement of a political candidate.

Discography

Comedy specials
 2000 Years with Carl Reiner and Mel Brooks (World Pacific Records, 1960)
 2001 Years with Carl Reiner and Mel Brooks (Capitol Records, 1961)
 Carl Reiner and Mel Brooks at the Cannes Film Festival (Capitol Records, 1962)
 2000 and Thirteen with Carl Reiner and Mel Brooks (Warner Bros. Records, 1973)
 The Incomplete Works Of Carl Reiner & Mel Brooks (Warner Bros. Records, 1973)
 Excerpts from The Complete 2000 Year Old Man (Rhino Records, 1994)
 The 2000 Year Old Man in the Year 2000 (Rhino Records, 1997)

Soundtracks
 The Producers (RCA Victor, 1968)
 High Anxiety – Original Soundtrack (Asylum Records, 1978)
 Mel Brooks' History of the World Part I (Warner Bros. Records, 1981)
 To Be or Not To Be (Island Records, 1984)
 The Producers: Original Broadway Recording (Sony Classical, 2001)

Honors and legacy 

Brooks is one of the few people who have received an Oscar, an Emmy, a Tony, and a Grammy. He won his first Grammy for Best Spoken Comedy Album in 1999 for his recording of The 2000 Year Old Man in the Year 2000 with Carl Reiner. His two other Grammys came in 2002 for Best Musical Show Album for the cast album of The Producers and for Best Long Form Music Video for the DVD "Recording the Producers – A Musical Romp with Mel Brooks". He won his first of four Emmy awards in 1967 for Outstanding Writing Achievement in Variety for a Sid Caesar special, and won Emmys in 1997, 1998, and 1999 for Outstanding Guest Actor in a Comedy Series for his role of Uncle Phil on Mad About You. He won his Academy Award for Original Screenplay (Oscar) in 1968 for The Producers. He won his three Tony awards in 2001 for his work on the musical The Producers, for Best Musical, Best Original Musical Score, and Best Book of a Musical.

Brooks also won a Hugo Award and Nebula Award for Young Frankenstein. In a 2005 poll by Channel 4 to find The Comedian's Comedian, he was voted No. 50 of the top 50 comedy acts ever by fellow comedians and comedy insiders.

The American Film Institute (AFI) lists three of Brooks' films on its AFI's 100 Years...100 Laughs list: Blazing Saddles (#6), The Producers (#11), and Young Frankenstein (#13).

On December 5, 2009, Brooks was one of five recipients of the 2009 Kennedy Center Honors at the John F. Kennedy Center for the Performing Arts in Washington, DC. He was inducted into the Hollywood Walk of Fame on April 23, 2010, with a motion pictures star located at 6712 Hollywood Boulevard. American Masters produced a biography on Brooks which premiered May 20, 2013, on PBS. The AFI presented Brooks with its highest tribute, the AFI Life Achievement Award, in June 2013. In 2014 Brooks was honored in a handprint and footprint ceremony at TCL Chinese Theatre. His concrete handprints include a six-fingered left hand as he wore a prosthetic finger when making his prints. On March 20, 2015, he received a British Film Institute Fellowship from the British Film Institute.

References

Further reading 
 Adler, Bill, and Jeffrey Feinman. Mel Brooks: The Irreverent Funnyman. Chicago: Playboy Press, 1976. .

 Brooks, Mel All About Me: My Remarkable Life in Show Business. New York: Ballantine, 2021.
 Crick, Robert A. The Big Screen Comedies of Mel Brooks. Jefferson, NC: McFarland, 2002. . .
 Holtzman, William. Seesaw, a Dual Biography of Anne Bancroft and Mel Brooks. Garden City, NY: Doubleday, 1979. .
 McGilligan, Patrick. Funny Man: Mel Brooks. Harper, 2019, .
 Parish, James Robert (2007). It's Good to Be the King: The Seriously Funny Life of Mel Brooks. Hoboken, NJ: Wiley. . .
 Symons, Alex. Mel Brooks in the Cultural Industries: Survival and Prolonged Adaptation. Edinburgh: Edinburgh University Press, 2012. . .
 Yacowar, Maurice. Method in Madness: The Comic Art of Mel Brooks. New York: St. Martin's Press, 1981. . .

Interviews
 Mel Brooks interview with Studs Terkel on WFMT, July 2, 1968 
 Mel Brooks interview on BBC Radio 4 Desert Island Discs, July 4, 1978
    Mel Brooks Interview (2001) — Tony Awards
 Mel Brooks interview on NPR Fresh Air (March 16, 2005)
 biographer James Robert Parish interview (2007) — Alt Film Guide
 Mel Brooks interview on NPR Fresh Air (December 7, 2021)

External links 

 
 
 
 
 
 
 Mel Brooks – Box Office Data Movie Director at The Numbers
 Mel Brooks – Box Office Data Movie Star at The Numbers
 
 Mel Brooks Virtual-History.com (Photographs and Books)
  (2000 Year Old Man)
 

 
1926 births
Living people
20th-century American comedians
20th-century American male actors
20th-century American screenwriters
21st-century American comedians
21st-century American male actors
21st-century American screenwriters
21st-century American memoirists
AFI Life Achievement Award recipients
Abraham Lincoln High School (Brooklyn) alumni
American comedy musicians
American humorists
American male comedians
American male film actors
American male television actors
American male voice actors
American musical theatre lyricists
American parodists
American people of German-Jewish descent
American people of Polish-Jewish descent
American people of Russian-Jewish descent
American people of Ukrainian-Jewish descent
American satirists
American theatre managers and producers
Audiobook narrators
BAFTA fellows
Best Original Screenplay Academy Award winners
Broadway theatre producers
Comedians from New York City
Comedy film directors
Counterculture of the 1960s
Eastern District High School alumni
Ethnic humour
Film directors from New York City
Grammy Award winners
Hugo Award-winning writers
Jewish American comedians
Jewish American comedy writers
Jewish American male actors
Jewish American military personnel
Jewish American songwriters
Jewish American film directors
Jewish American writers
Jewish comedy and humor
Jewish film people
Jewish male actors
Jewish male comedians
Kennedy Center honorees
Male actors from New York City
Military personnel from New York City
Musicians from Brooklyn
Nebula Award winners
Parody film directors
People from Williamsburg, Brooklyn
Postmodernist filmmakers
Primetime Emmy Award winners
Secular Jews
Silent film directors
Songwriters from New York (state)
Tony Award winners
United Service Organizations entertainers
United States Army non-commissioned officers
United States Army personnel of World War II
United States National Medal of Arts recipients
Writers from Brooklyn